Pramod Chandra Mody (born 1 September 1959) is a 1982–batch retired Indian Revenue Service officer. He is currently serving as Secretary General of the Rajya Sabha. He served as Chairperson of the Central Board of Direct Taxes from February 2019 to May 2021. He had one of the longest tenures as CBDT chief.

References 

Indian civil servants
Indian Revenue Service officers
1959 births

Living people